Camellia School of Engineering & Technology, commonly known as CSET, is a technical degree college located in Barasat, North 24 Parganas district in the Indian state of West Bengal.

Courses

 Civil Engineering
 Computer Science and Engineering
 Electronics and Communication Engineering
 Electrical Engineering
 Mechanical Engineering

References

External links
 http://www.cset.org.in/

Universities and colleges in North 24 Parganas district
Educational institutions established in 2008
2008 establishments in West Bengal
Colleges affiliated to West Bengal University of Technology